Lucas Fernández (born 12 June 1999) is an Argentine professional footballer who plays as a forward for Juventud Unida.

Career
Fernández's senior career started in the ranks of Independiente Rivadavia. He was initially selected as a substitute for Primera B Nacional matches against Los Andes, Central Córdoba and Platense in the opening period of the 2018–19 campaign but wasn't selected to come on. His professional debut arrived during a defeat to Mitre on 3 February 2019; he was subbed on for Matías Tissera with twenty minutes left.

Career statistics
.

References

External links

1999 births
Living people
Sportspeople from Mendoza Province
Argentine footballers
Argentine expatriate footballers
Association football forwards
Primera Nacional players
National First Division players
Independiente Rivadavia footballers
Jomo Cosmos F.C. players
Juventud Unida Universitario players
Argentine expatriate sportspeople in South Africa
Expatriate soccer players in South Africa